A True Mob Story is a 1998 Hong Kong crime drama film produced, written and directed by Wong Jing and starring Andy Lau and Gigi Leung.

Plot
In 1993, Wai Kat-cheung is an underling of Prince. Since Cheung was young, his father was a triad member so Cheung also joined the triad. One time when Prince owed Crazy Ball a HK$3 million debt, Crazy Ball abducted Prince and Cheung rescues him by slicing Crazy Ball's left eye. Although he later became highly regarded by Prince and his status rose, he also had to pay a heavy price. He not only forged a vendetta with Crazy Ball, that night, his wife Cindy also saw him slaughtering and went to help him but was run over by a car.

Cindy's good friend Ruby, who has had a longtime crush on Cheung, helps Cheung take care of his son Tai-hung. Since Cheung is always referred as a bad guy by Tai-hung's classmates which made Tai-hung have violent tendencies toward his classmates and develops serious eccentric sense.

Five years later, in 1998, Cheung and Prince have a partnership in a factory specializing in the production of unlicensed VCD movie discs, Prince was hiding from Cheung and secretly operate a dirty mass production of cocaine. One time while collecting debts, Cheung crushed a man named Chow Tai-man's head and was sued to court and therefore meets defense attorney Sandy. Sandy's boyfriend, Michael has been monitoring Cheung's factory and suspects Cheung of engaging in drug trafficking activities. When Michael knew Sandy was fighting the case for Cheung, he suggested that Sandy abort Cheung's defense but was refused, and later Sandy successfully helped Cheung win the case.

While Cheung looks over his factory with Prince, he also protects Ruby, who works in an entertainment venue. Prince coveted Ruby for a long time and was hindered by Cheung, Prince resents toward Cheung. Finally one time when Prince tried to get Ruby and got into conflict with Cheung, Cheung was seriously injured. Since then, Cheung and Ruby formally start a relationship

One night when Cheung and Sandy were out in the streets, they were confronted by Crazy Ball who came for revenge. Cheung successfully escapes with Sandy on his motorcycle. Afterward, Cheung asked for help in the gang to cope with Crazy Ball, but they refused to help since they considered it to be Cheung's personal enmity.

Sandy learned from Michael that Cheung might be involved in drug trafficking activities, therefore she goes to ask Cheung. Later Cheung goes to the factory to examine and discovers the truth of the gang's long-term drug trafficking. At this moment, Crazy Ball broke into Cheung's residence and holds Ruby and Tai-hung hostage. On his way to save the two, Cheung was arrested by the police for drug trafficking. Although he was released soon, but that night, Ruby was gang raped and Tai-hung lost his eyesight.

Crazy Ball cannot be reconciled for not finding Cheung and in order to continue to take revenge, he killed Prince, which angers the gang leader, Uncle Mei. Uncle Mei sends many henchmen to kill Crazy Ball. Although he was chased by the gang, he finally died in the hands of Cheung. This was witnessed by David, who was an undercover cop planted by Michael. Cheung was wanted for murder Crazy Ball and goes to Sandy for help. Sandy reveals that she loves him and will not let him go to jail. Sandy suggested Cheung to turn himself in so she can defend him, and let Cheung be the tainted witness of drug trafficking case, which leads Uncle Mei to prison.

Michael always wanted to arrest Cheung, but David, who has been undercover for a year, conscientiously gives a favorable testimony of Cheung. In the most critical moment of the last trial, she commissioned another lawyer to be Cheung's defense lawyer, and she transformed into a new witness. She testifies that Cheung is her boyfriend, and during Crazy Ball's murder, they were in her apartment. Her testimony was accepted by the jury and Cheung was finally acquitted. She also felt guilty lying to herself and felt unworthy for her boyfriend Michael.

Outside the courthouse, Cheung catches up with Sandy to express his gratitude to her, and Sandy said they do not fit together, and claims she only did that just to not let him go to jail and tells him to take good care of Ruby and Tai-hung. As they separate, Cheung was unexpectedly killed by Uncle Mei's henchmen on the streets.

Cast
Andy Lau as Wai Kat-cheung / Cheung Dee
Gigi Leung as Sandy Leung
Alex Fong as Michael
Suki Kwan as Ruby
Mark Cheng as Prince
Sam Lee as Sun Sa
Ben Ng as Crazy Ball
Frankie Ng as Gusty Chuen
Lee Siu-kei as Pau Wing
Jeffery Yu
David Lee as David
Joe Ma as Lion King
Angie Cheung as Cindy (guest star)
Michael Chan as Uncle Mei
Wong Tin-lam as Uncle Fatty
Dennis Chan as Judge for murder case
Teddy Chan as Prosecutor in murder case
Samson Yeung
Ray Pang as Fat Chow Tai-man
Chris Chan
Ben Yuen as Prosecutor in assault case
Wu Kai-kwong
Chow Hiu-kwong
Ng Ka-wai as VCD factory manager
Lee Chun-sam as Dee's solicitor
Lee Sheung-kwan
Chan Po-chun as One of Prince's men
Tsui Tse-fung
Leung Wai-ling
Lu Lei
Law Shu-kei as Judge for assault case
Gary Mak as Police officer
Sam Ho as Triad at VCD factory
Chow Mei-sing as Crazy Ball's gangster
So Wai-nam as Crazy Ball's gangster
Ma Yuk-sing as Killer of Gutsy Chuen in minibus
Cheang Pou-soi as Uncle Mei's bodyguard
Sherwing Ming as lawyer's secretary
Law Wai-kai as Uncle Mei's bodyguard

Theme songs
You Are My Woman (你是我的女人)
Composer: Kenny G, TK Chan, Walter Afanasieff
Lyricist/Singer: Andy Lau
Only a Mouth Left (死剩把口)
Composer: Suen Wai Lun
Lyricist/Singer: Andy Lau

Box office
The film grossed HK$16,931,285 at the Hong Kong box office during its theatrical run from 1 July to 31 July 1998 in Hong Kong.

Award nomination
18th Hong Kong Film Awards
Nominated: Best Original Film Song (Composer: Kenny G, TK Chan, Walter Afanasieff, Lyricicst/Singer: Andy Lau)

See also
Andy Lau filmography
Wong Jing filmography

External links

A True Mob Story at Hong Kong Cinemagic

A True Mob Story Review at LoveHKFilm.com

1998 films
1998 action thriller films
1998 crime drama films
1998 romantic drama films
Hong Kong action thriller films
Triad films
1990s Cantonese-language films
Films directed by Wong Jing
Films set in Hong Kong
Films shot in Hong Kong
1990s Hong Kong films